Live at the Royal Albert Hall is a live album by English rock band Arctic Monkeys, consisting of their 7 June 2018 performance at the Royal Albert Hall in London. It was released on 4 December 2020 through Domino Recording Company, with all proceeds going to the War Child charity.

Critical reception
NME gave the album a 5-star review, saying "it's the sound of a band who delight in defying expectations".

Pitchfork gave the album 7.3 out of 10 and stated the "set leans heavily on the band's last two albums but still plays like a greatest hits."

Track listing

Personnel 

Performers 
 Alex Turner – lead vocals; guitar (2–4, 7–8, 10–11, 13–14, 16–17, 19–20), keyboards (1, 6, 12, 15, 18)
 Jamie Cook – guitar (1–17, 19–20), keyboards (1, 18), lap steel (18)
 Nick O'Malley – bass guitar; backing vocals (1–5, 10–11, 13, 15–16, 18–20)
 Matt Helders – drums; backing vocals (1–2, 4–5, 10–11, 14, 16–20)
 Tom Rowley – guitar (1, 3, 5–6, 11–12, 18), keyboards (2, 4, 7, 9–10, 13, 15–16, 20), lap steel (8, 15), backing vocals (1, 3–5, 10–11, 13, 16, 20)
 Tyler Parkford – keyboards (1–13, 15–18, 20), backing vocals (1, 3–5, 10–11, 13, 16–18, 20)
 Scott Gillies – 12-string acoustic guitar (1)
 Cameron Avery – acoustic guitar (1), keyboards (1, 12–13), backing vocals (1, 13)
 Davey Latter – percussion (1–2, 4–5, 8, 10–12, 16, 18)

Technical personnel
 James Ford – mixing engineering
 Matt Colton – mastering engineering
 Red TX Audio – audio recording

Crew
 Steven G Chapman – tour management
 Ian Calder – production management
 Greta Cantos – production coordination
 Toby Plant – stage management
 Matthew Kettle – FOH audio engineering
 William Doyle – monitor engineering
 Graham Feast – lighting operation
 Scott Gillies – backline
 David Latter – backline
 Andrew Dimmack – backline
 Steven Body – backline

Artwork
 Zackery Michael – photography
 Matthew Cooper – design

Charts

Weekly charts

Year-end charts

References

External links

2020 live albums
Arctic Monkeys live albums